Southern Careers Institute (SCI) is a private, for-profit post-secondary career and technical education institution with eight locations in Texas, US, founded in 1960. The school is accredited by the Council on Occupational Education and approved by the Texas Workforce Commission and the Texas Department of Assistive and Rehabilitative Services.

Mission 
The mission of Southern Careers Institute is to be a leading talent producer by delivering employer-tailored training that results in a Day-1 (TM) ready workforce.

Locations 
SCI has eight physical locations in Texas including Austin, Brownsville, Corpus Christi,  Harlingen,  Pharr,  two in San Antonio, and Waco. SCI also offers courses online.

Online 
In 2014 Southern Careers Institute had one or more programs available in an online format to students across Texas. In 2016 the school partnered with CoderCamps to provide a Full Stack Javascript Program. In October 2017, SCI partnered with Woz U to provide software developing online with language options in JAVA, C#, JavaScript and Ruby.

References

External links
 Official website

Private universities and colleges in Texas
Educational institutions accredited by the Council on Occupational Education
Vocational education